Marava is a genus of little earwigs in the family Spongiphoridae. There are more than 50 described species in Marava.

Species
These 51 species belong to the genus Marava:

 Marava alluaudi (Burr, 1904)
 Marava arachidis (Yersin, 1860)
 Marava bidentata Brindle, 1971
 Marava brasiliana Brindle, 1971
 Marava calverti (Rehn, 1921)
 Marava championi (de Bormans, 1893)
 Marava chapmani Steinmann, 1979
 Marava dominicae (Rehn & Hebard, 1917)
 Marava draco Steinmann, 1985
 Marava elegantula Brindle, 1973
 Marava emarginata Brindle, 1977
 Marava equatoria (Burr, 1899)
 Marava feae (Dubrony, 1879)
 Marava flaviscuta (Rehn, 1903)
 Marava flavohumeralis Brindle, 1988
 Marava fulgida Brindle, 1970
 Marava furia Steinmann, 1989
 Marava grata Steinmann, 1985
 Marava grenadensis Brindle, 1971
 Marava griveaudi Brindle, 1966
 Marava hildebrandti (Burr, 1912)
 Marava jamaicana (Rehn & Hebard, 1917)
 Marava lucida (Brindle, 1968)
 Marava luzonica (Dohrn, 1864)
 Marava machupicchuensis Brindle, 1971
 Marava mexicana (de Bormans, 1883)
 Marava modesta (Brunner, 1906)
 Marava moreirai (Menozzi, 1932)
 Marava nigrella (Dubrony, 1879)
 Marava nigrocincta Brindle, 1988
 Marava nitida (Burr, 1904)
 Marava pallida Brindle, 1988
 Marava paradoxa (Burr, 1904)
 Marava paraguayensis (Caudell, 1904)
 Marava parva (Burr, 1912)
 Marava parvula Brindle, 1988
 Marava pulchella (Audinet-Serville, 1838)
 Marava pygidiata Brindle, 1988
 Marava pyxis Steinmann, 1985
 Marava quadrata Brindle, 1971
 Marava rogersi (de Bormans, 1893)
 Marava rotundata (Scudder, 1876)
 Marava severini (Burr, 1900)
 Marava silvestrii (Borelli, 1905)
 Marava splendida Steinmann, 1985
 Marava surinamensis (Brindle, 1968)
 Marava townesi Brindle, 1979
 Marava tricolor (Kirby, 1891)
 Marava triquetra (Hebard, 1917)
 Marava unidentata (Palisot de Beauvois, 1805)
 Marava venezuelica Brindle, 1977

References

Further reading

 
 

Earwigs
Articles created by Qbugbot